Matteo Castaldo (born 11 December 1985) is an Italian rower. In the coxless four, he won the bronze medal at the Rio 2016 and Tokyo 2020 Olympic Games, a gold medal at the 2015 World Rowing Championships, and the silver medal at the 2017 World Rowing Championships and at the 2018 World Rowing Championships.

References

External links

Italian male rowers
Rowers from Naples
1985 births
Living people
World Rowing Championships medalists for Italy
Rowers at the 2016 Summer Olympics
Olympic rowers of Italy
Medalists at the 2016 Summer Olympics
Olympic medalists in rowing
Olympic bronze medalists for Italy
Mediterranean Games gold medalists for Italy
Mediterranean Games medalists in rowing
Competitors at the 2013 Mediterranean Games
Rowers of Fiamme Oro
Rowers at the 2020 Summer Olympics
Medalists at the 2020 Summer Olympics
20th-century Italian people
21st-century Italian people